Wyndham Edwards (23 June 1892 – 8 May 1961) was a Welsh gymnast. He competed in the men's team all-around event at the 1920 Summer Olympics.

References

1892 births
1961 deaths
Welsh male artistic gymnasts
Olympic gymnasts of Great Britain
Gymnasts at the 1920 Summer Olympics
Sportspeople from Abertillery